The Forest Oracle is an adventure module for the Dungeons & Dragons role-playing game.

Plot summary
Forest Oracle is an adventure scenario in which the player characters seek the help of a Great Druid to lift a curse on the land known as the Downs.

The Downs, a lush valley on the edge of the Greate Olde Woode, are dying.  Livestock and crops simply rot and drop to the parched ground.  The druids who have protected the area have retreated into the thick forest, and the party must find them to undo the evil that's happening in the Downs.

Publication history
N2 Forest Oracle was written by Carl Smith, with a cover by Keith Parkinson and interior illustrations by Jeff Easley, and was published by TSR in 1984 as a 32-page booklet with an outer folder.

Reception

References

Dungeons & Dragons modules
Role-playing game supplements introduced in 1984